Europa Magazine is the only monthly magazine in the Bosnian language in the United States.

Overview 
The first edition of the Europa Magazine was published in Atlanta on August 1, 2005.

Editors-in-chief
 Since 2005 : Haris Delalić

External links 
 EuropaMagazine.info, the magazine's online version 

2005 establishments in Georgia (U.S. state)
Bosnian-language mass media
Croatian-language magazines
Magazines established in 2005
Magazines published in Atlanta
Monthly magazines published in the United States
News magazines published in the United States
Serbian-language magazines